The 1971 Inter-Cities Fairs Cup Final was the final of the thirteenth and last Inter-Cities Fairs Cup. It was played on 28 May and 3 June 1971 between Juventus of Italy and Leeds United of England. Leeds won the tie 3–3 on away goals.

The game that was originally scheduled to be the first leg game, on 26 May, was abandoned after 51 minutes of play with a score of 0–0 due to heavy rain and waterlogged pitch.

Route to the final

Match details

First leg

Second leg 

Leeds United won 3–3 on away goals

See also 
 1970–71 Inter-Cities Fairs Cup
 Juventus F.C. in European football
 Leeds United F.C. in European football

References

External links 
 RSSSF

2
Inter-Cities Fairs Cup Final 1971
Inter-Cities Fairs Cup Final 1971
Inter-Cities Fairs Cup Final 1971
Inter-Cities Fairs Cup Final 1971
1971
May 1971 sports events in Europe
Sports competitions in Turin
1970s in Turin
1970s in Leeds
Sports competitions in Leeds